Clement Hill (2 July 1904 – 21 May 1988) was an Australian cricketer. He played fifteen first-class matches for New South Wales between 1932/33 and 1934/35.

See also
 List of New South Wales representative cricketers

References

External links
 

1904 births
1988 deaths
Australian cricketers
New South Wales cricketers